Under Secretary for Economic Affairs may refer to:

 for that position the US Department of Commerce : see Under Secretary of Commerce for Economic Affairs
 for that position in the US Department of State, from 1946 to 1985 : see Under Secretary of State for Economic Growth, Energy, and the Environment